Pa Phayom is the northernmost district (amphoe) of Phatthalung province, southern Thailand.

Geography
Neighboring districts are (from the southeast clockwise) Khuan Khanun, Si Banphot of Phattalung Province, Huai Yot of Trang province and Cha-uat of Nakhon Si Thammarat province.

History
The minor district (king amphoe) was established on 19 January 1990, when four tambons were split off from Khuan Khanun district. It was upgraded to a full district on 7 September 1995.

Administration
The district is divided into four sub-districts (tambons), which are further subdivided into 39 villages (mubans). There are no municipal (thesabans). There are four tambon administrative organizations (TAO).

References

External links
amphoe.com

Districts of Phatthalung province